The World From Here EP was Nashville, Tennessee-based band Llama's second and final release before their 2003 breakup.

Track listing 
"Fly to You" (Kenny Greenberg, Ben Morton, Matt Rollings) – 4:09
"Wildest Dreams" (Adam Binder, Morton) – 4:15
"Waking Up" (Greenberg, Morton, Rollings) – 3:22
"Serena" (Morton) – 9:44

References

Llama (band) albums
2002 EPs
MCA Records EPs